Frederick Harris (born 7 December 1984) is a judoka from Sierra Leone.

He was selected to compete in the Judo at the 2020 Summer Olympics – Men's 81 kg. He was the flag bearer for Sierra Leone at the opening ceremony in Tokyo. However, Harris did not compete after being disqualified for being overweight.

References

External links
 

Living people
1984 births
Sierra Leone Creole people
Sierra Leonean male judoka